The City of Austin, Texas, and its metropolitan area has only one major league professional sports team. The city's professional soccer team, Austin FC, competes in Major League Soccer. Austin is also home to the University of Texas Longhorns and to several minor-league sports teams.

Teams

University of Texas Longhorns
Many Austinites support the athletic programs of the University of Texas at Austin known as the Texas Longhorns. During the 2005–06 academic term, Longhorns football team was named the NCAA Division I FBS National Football Champion and Longhorns baseball team won the College World Series. The Texas Longhorns play home games in the state's second-largest sports stadium, Darrell K Royal–Texas Memorial Stadium, seating over 101,000 fans. Baseball games are played at UFCU Disch–Falk Field which underwent renovation in 1996 with an increased capacity to 6,756 seats plus 11 stadium suites.

Professional sports
Before Austin FC's arrival in 2021, Austin was the largest city in the United States without a club in a major professional sports league. Minor-league professional sports came to Austin in 1996, when the Austin Ice Bats began playing at the Travis County Expo Center. Since then, the Austin Ice Bats have been replaced by the Texas Stars of the American Hockey League. Other teams have come to Austin including the Austin Spurs of the NBA Development League (later rebranded as the NBA G League).The Austin Huns Rugby Football Club entered into their first year as a professional sports entity in 2016. The Round Rock Express Baseball Club, the Triple-A affiliate of the Texas Rangers, play at Dell Diamond. The Express are owned and operated by Ryan Sanders Sports and Entertainment, which is led by Baseball Hall-of-Famer, Nolan Ryan.

In October 2017, Precourt Sports Ventures announced a plan to move the Columbus Crew SC soccer franchise from Columbus, Ohio to Austin. Precourt reached an arrangement with the City of Austin to construct a new courthouse $200 million stadium on public land at 10414 McKalla Place. However, in October 2018, Jimmy Haslam, owner of the Cleveland Browns of the National Football League, along with Columbus businessman Pete Edwards Jr. announced plans to acquire the Crew to keep the club in central Ohio and Precourt was instead granted an expansion club to operate in Austin. Austin FC was then announced to start play in the 2021 season.

Biking, swimming, and running
Natural features like the bicycle-friendly Texas Hill Country, limestone rock formations, and generally mild climate work with the centrally located Lady Bird Lake Hike and Bike Trail, and local pools like Barton Springs to make Austin the home of several endurance and multi-sport races and communities. The Capitol 10,000 is the largest  race in Texas, and approximately fifth largest in the United States. The Austin Marathon has been run in the city every year since 1992. The Austin-founded American Swimming Association hosts an open water swimming event, the Cap 2 K, and other closed-course, open water, and cable swim races around town.

Austin is also the hometown of several cycling groups and the former seven-time Tour de France champion cyclist Lance Armstrong, as well as environmentally and economically minded bicycle commuters. Combining these three disciplines is a growing crop of triathlons, including the Capital of Texas Triathlon held every Memorial Day on and around Lady Bird Lake, Auditorium Shores, and Downtown Austin. Local cyclists also compete in the Driveway Series, a weekly bicycle criterium held at Driveway Austin.

Auto racing

In June 2010 it was announced by the Formula One chief executive Bernie Ecclestone that the Austin area would host the Formula One, United States Grand Prix, from 2012 until 2021. The effort was aided by State Comptroller Susan Combs. The State has pledged to put up $25 million in public funds annually for 10 years to pay the sanctioning fees for the race.  The event was last held in 2007 at the Indianapolis Motor Speedway. A Formula One circuit will need to be built at an estimated cost of $250 to $300 million, paid for by private investors, and is expected to be located just east of the Austin Bergstrom International Airport. The Austin investor group is headed by Tavo Hellmund, President of Full Throttle Productions, LP. Hellmund, of Austin, is himself a former race car owner and driver. Circuit of the Americas will also play host to MotoGP World Championships from 2013. Lewis Hamilton won the 2012 United States Grand Prix at Austin on November 18.

Driveway Austin was a motorsports track and racing school within the city, although not hosting sanctioned races and closing in 2021 to be annexed into a city park. Harris Hill Raceway in San Marcos hosts several racing series.

Other sports
In July 2013 ESPN announced the X Games would relocate from Los Angeles to Austin, where the city served as one of six stops on the Global X Games circuit from 2014 to 2018 at the Circuit of the Americas.

Austin is also considered the birthplace of all-women's flat track roller derby. In 2003, the Texas Rollergirls formed as the first league to play modern flat-track roller derby and, in 2005, were instrumental in the rule-setting and track design used by the Women's Flat Track Derby Association.

In March 2022, Austin was awarded a 250 level women's tennis event, the ATX Open. It started in February 2023.

References